Amaranthus brownii was an annual herb in the family Amaranthaceae. It was one of nine species of Amaranthus in the Hawaiian Islands, as well as the only endemic Hawaiian species of the genus. It is now considered extinct.

A. brownii was first discovered during the Tanager Expedition in 1923 by botanist Edward Leonard Caum. It differed from other Hawaiian species of Amaranthus with its spineless leaf axils, linear leaves, and indehiscent fruits. It was one of 26 vascular plants on Nihoa, 17 of which are indigenous, six alien, and three endemic only to Nihoa; these latter three included A. brownii, the Nihoa fan palm or loulu, and the Nihoa carnation. A. brownii was considered the rarest plant on Nihoa and was not directly observed on the island after 1983. Past expeditions collected plant samples and seeds, but no specimens managed to survive ex-situ conservation efforts outside of its native habitat. Consequently, there are no known plants or seeds from A. brownii in any botanical garden.

Conservation and recovery plans for A. brownii were proposed by the United States Fish and Wildlife Service (FWS), which administers the island of Nihoa as part of the Hawaiian Islands National Wildlife Refuge in the Papahānaumokuākea Marine National Monument. In 1996, the plant was listed by the FWS as an endangered species. In 2003, the FWS designated the island of Nihoa as a critical habitat for the plant and it was classified as critically endangered on the IUCN Red List. Following a lack of sightings for over 35 years despite intensive surveys, the species was classified as extinct on the IUCN Red List in 2018.

Taxonomy
The species was first collected during a ten-day visit to the island of Nihoa by the Tanager Expedition. Botanist Edward Leonard Caum collected the first specimen on June 17, 1923, and a second was collected by cartographer Charles S. Judd on June 20, 1923. Forest B. H. Brown, botanist of the Bayard Dominick Expedition to the Marquesas Islands (1921–1922), helped provide descriptions and comments for some of the species described by Erling Christophersen and Caum. They named A. brownii after Brown in 1931 with the publication of their paper "Vascular plants of the Leeward Islands, Hawaii". In the paper they originally described A. brownii as one of 20 vascular plant species on the island of Nihoa. The FWS does not recognize a common name.

Description
Amaranthus brownii was the only endemic species of Hawaiian Amaranthus in the Hawaiian Islands. A. brownii was monoecious; that is, the male and female flowers were found together on the same plant. It differed from other Hawaiian species of Amaranthus with its spineless leaf axils, linear leaves, and indehiscent fruits (fruit which does not open to release seeds when ripe). The fruits were ovoid and between 0.8–1 mm long and 0.6–0.8 mm wide. The plant is thought to have been anemophilous (pollinated by wind).

Distribution and habitat

It is thought that this endemic plant had probably always been rare and restricted to Nihoa. Its former habitat is managed by the United States Fish and Wildlife Service and protected as part of the Hawaiian Islands National Wildlife Refuge in the Papahānaumokuākea Marine National Monument. A. brownii was one of three endemic and endangered species only found on Nihoa, along with the Nihoa fan palm (Pritchardia remota) and the Nihoa carnation (Schiedea verticillata). At least nine other native plant species can be found in its habitat, including Hawaiian goosefoot (Chenopodium oahuense), lovegrass (Eragrostis variablis), koali awa (Ipomoea indica), goat's foot (Ipomoea pes-caprae subsp. brasiliensis), Panicum torridum, naupaka (Scaevola sericea), Sicyos pachycarpus, ilima (Sida fallax), and Nelson's horsenettle (Solanum nelsonii).

At the time of its discovery in 1923, botanists first observed the plant growing in great quantity on the ridges towards Miller Peak and on eastern ridges of the island. Expeditions in the early and mid-1960s failed to identify any specimens, but in 1969, ethnobotanist Douglas E. Yen of the Bishop Museum collected specimens near Miller Peak. Derral R. Herbst and Wayne Takeuchi of the FWS collected the last known specimen on July 27, 1980. Carl C. Christensen also visited Nihoa in 1980 to reevaluate endemic species last observed on the Tanager Expedition. Sheila Conant and Mark S. Collins visited Nihoa in 1980 as well; Conant returned twice in 1981, first with Mark J. Rauzon and later with Audrey L. Newman. In 1983, Conant visited the island with Wayne C. Gagné. Conant found A. brownii growing on the island in 1981 and 1983, by which time only two populations of 35 plants were thought to exist: 23 plants were found near Miller Peak and 12 plants in Middle Valley.

Prehistoric Polynesian habitation on Nihoa may have initially led to a decrease in the plant population of A. brownii. Major threats to the plant included invasive species, fire, and hybridization with other Amaranthus species. Inbreeding was a serious threat, as the small plant population must reproduce within its own circle resulting in genetic defects. A. brownii was also forced to compete with the non-native weed (Portulaca oleracea), the plant's main alien species threat. In 2002 and 2004, the invasive gray bird grasshopper (Schistocerca nitens) presented an even larger threat to A. brownii. First recorded on the island in 1977, the increasing population density of gray bird grasshoppers led to massive defoliation on the island, leaving A. brownii at greater risk of predation. In 2004 alone, an estimated 400,000 gray bird grasshoppers destroyed almost 90% of the vegetation on Nihoa. All these threats may have contributed to its ultimate extinction.

Conservation
 
According to zoologist and conservationist Sheila Conant, A. brownii was important due to its uniqueness in the Northwestern Hawaiian Islands as "the only Hawaiian endemic in this large genus which contains many economically and nutritionally important species." However, in more than a decade of field surveys on Nihoa, no living plants were identified. Wildlife refuge staff visited the island during the dry season at least 21 times between 1983 and 1996. Originally, botanists thought the absence of the plant in field surveys might have been explained by the time of visits  During the summer months, the stems of A. brownii dried up and could not be distinguished from other herbaceous plants. However, a seven-day visit to the island in April 2006 still did not find any specimens. Additional winter surveys were performed, but none were successful.

Ex-situ conservation efforts to propagate A. brownii by seed in botanical gardens were also unsuccessful. During the 1981 expedition, A. bronwii seeds were collected by Sheila Conant and presented to the Waimea Arboretum on the Hawaiian island of Oahu and the Kew Gardens in London, England. Although the seeds at the Waimea Arboretum germinated and grew for a while, no plants survived beyond the stage of seedling development. Information about the outcome of the seeds sent to Kew Gardens is unavailable.

A proposal for listing A. brownii under the U.S. Endangered Species Act was originally submitted on June 16, 1976, but was withdrawn on December 10, 1979, as out of date and incomplete. It was proposed again on March 24, 1993, and was federally listed as an endangered species on August 21, 1996. On May 22, 2003, the FWS designated  on the island of Nihoa as a critical habitat for A. brownii, as well as Pritchardia remota, Schiedea verticillata, and two other species also found on Nihoa and other Hawaiian islands, ohai (Sesbania tomentosa) and Mariscus pennatiformis. Also in 2003, A. brownii was internationally classified as critically endangered on the IUCN Red List. As of 2010, A. brownii was one of 51 Hawaiian plant species listed as endangered or threatened under the Endangered Species Act.

Notes

a.  Wagner and Herbst list five naturalized species of Amaranthus in Hawaii in addition to the endemic A. brownii. The authors note that the information may be both inaccurate and incomplete due to errors caused by a lost collection and lack of data. A. graecizans, A. retroflexus, and a third unknown species (possibly extinct or reclassified) have been proposed as additional naturalized candidates.

{| class="wikitable"
|-
| colspan=5 style="background:white" | Species of Amaranthus found in the Hawaiian Islands:
|-
! style="background:white" align="right" | Genus
! style="background:white" align="center" | Species
! style="background:white" align="center" | Common name
! style="background:white" align="center" | Status
! style="background:white" align="center" | Range
|-
| rowspan=6 style="background:Gainsboro" valign="top" | Amaranthus
| A. brownii
| align="left" | none
| align="left" | Extinct
| align="left" | Nihoa (end)
|-
| A. dubius
| align="left" | Spleen amaranth
| align="left" | n/a
| align="left" | Kauai, Oahu, Lanai, Hawaii
|-
| A. hybridus
| align="left" | Green amaranth
| align="left" | n/a
| align="left" | Oahu, Maui
|-
| A. lividus
| align="left" | Purple amaranth
| align="left" | n/a
| align="left" | Kauai, Oahu, Maui, Hawaii
|-
| A. spinosus
| align="left" | Spiny amaranth (pakai kuku)
| align="left" | n/a
| align="left" | Kure Atoll, Kauai, Oahu, Maui, Hawaii
|-
| A. viridis
| align="left" | Slender amaranth (pakai, aheahea, pakaikai, pakapakai)
| align="left" | n/a
| align="left" | Kure Atoll, Kaʻula, Kauai, Oahu, Lanai, Maui, Kahoolawe, Hawaii
|-
| colspan=5 style="background:white" | A. brownii is one of 12 endemic flowering plant species in the family Amaranthaceae found in the Hawaiian Islands:
|-
! style="background:white" align="right" | Genus
! style="background:white" align="center" | Species
! style="background:white" align="center" | Common name
! style="background:white" align="center" | Status
! style="background:white" align="center" | Range
|-
| rowspan=3 style="background:Gainsboro" valign="top" | Achyranthes| A. atollensis| align="left" | Hawaii chaff flower
| align="left" | Extinct
| align="left" | Kure Atoll, Midway Atoll, Pearl and Hermes Atoll, Laysan (ex.)
|-
| A. mutica| align="left" | Blunt chaff flower
| align="left" | Critically endangered
| align="left" | Kauai (ex.), Hawaii (island)
|-
| A. splendens| align="left" | Maui chaff flower
| align="left" | Vulnerable
| align="left" | Oahu, Molokai (ex.), Lanai, Maui
|-
| rowspan=1 style="background:Gainsboro" valign="top"| Amaranthus| A. brownii| align="left" | 
| align="left" | Extinct
| align="left" | Nihoa
|-
| rowspan=5 style="background:Gainsboro" valign="top" | Charpentiera| C. densiflora| align="left" | Dense-flowered pāpala (pāpala)
| align="left" | Critically endangered
| align="left" | Kauai, Maui
|-
| C. elliptica| align="left" | Pāpala| align="left" | 
| align="left" | Kauai
|-
| C. obovata| align="left" | Broadleaf pāpala (pāpala)
| align="left" | 
| align="left" | Kauai, Oahu, Molokai, Lanai, Maui, Hawaii (island)
|-
| C. ovata| align="left" | Koʻolau Range pāpala (pāpala)
| align="left" |
| align="left" | Oahu, Molokai, Maui, Hawaii (island)
|-
| C. tomentosa| align="left" | Waiʻanae Range pāpala (pāpala)
| align="left" | 
| align="left" | Oahu, Molokai, Lanai, Maui, Hawaii (island)
|-
| rowspan=3 style="background:Gainsboro" valign="top" | Nototrichium| N. divaricatum| align="left" | Nā Pali rockwort (kuluʻī)
| align="left" | 
| align="left" | Kauai
|-
| N. humile| align="left" | Kaʻala rockwort (kuluʻī)
| align="left" | Endangered
| align="left" | Oahu, East Maui
|-
| N. sandwicense| align="left" | Hawaiʻi rockwort (kuluʻī)
| align="left" | 
| align="left" | All eight southeastern Hawaiian Islands
|-
|}

b.  Nihoa: fl, fr, June 20, 1923, C. S. Judd No. 2

c.  Herbst & Takeuchi 6545; BISH. Also see the database record at the U.S. National Herbarium: Herbst, D.R.; Takeuchi, W. No. 6545; Collection Date: 27 Jul 1980; Hawaiian Islands, Nihoa, Middle Valley. Alt. 91 m.; Barcode: 00453038 USNM No.: 02921853.

d.  According to Mark J. Rauzon, anthropologist Kenneth Emory, a member of the Tanager Expedition, identified 66 archaeological sites on the island of Nihoa, and to date 86 sites have been found. Emory estimated that 7.7 percent of the island (12 out of 156 acres) was used for terraced, dry-land crop production, and along with fish and seafowl, Emory believed 100 people (or more) could have survived on a long-term basis. However, questions about good potable water sources and the fact that only six skeletons have been found cast doubt on this figure.

e.  Compare the destruction of vegetation on Nihoa in 2004 to that of Laysan island. In 1894, Max Schlemmer introduced rabbits to Laysan. Eventually, the rabbit problem and bird poaching led U.S. President Theodore Roosevelt to declare the Northwestern Hawaiian Islands a bird sanctuary in 1909. By 1918, 26 plant species had disappeared from the island and the Laysan millerbird had become extinct. The Tanager Expedition arrived in 1923 and exterminated the last of the surviving rabbits.

References

Further reading

External linksAmaranthus brownii Christoph. & Caum. Hawaii Biological Survey''. Bishop Museum. Retrieved May 20, 2011.

brownii
Endemic flora of Nihoa
Extinct flora of Hawaii
Plants described in 1931
Tanager Expedition
Plant extinctions since 1500